Lemont Township is one of 29 townships in Cook County, Illinois, USA.  As of the 2010 census, its population was 21,113.

Geography

Cities, towns, villages
 Lemont (most)
 Palos Park (west edge)
 Willow Springs (west edge)
 Woodridge (partial)

Unincorporated towns
 Hastings at 
 Sag Bridge at

Adjacent townships
 Downers Grove Township, DuPage County (north)
 Lyons Township (northeast)
 Palos Township (east)
 Orland Township (southeast)
 Homer Township, Will County (south)
 Lockport Township, Will County (southwest)
 DuPage Township, Will County (west)

Cemeteries
The township contains these four cemeteries: Bethany Lutheran, Danish, Mount Vernon Memorial Park and Saint Matthew Evangelical Lutheran.

Major highways
  Illinois Route 83
  Illinois Route 171

Airports and landing strips
 Lemont Fire Department Heliport
 Lemont Industrial Park Airport
(Closed and demolished for residential subdivision)

Rivers
 Des Plaines River

Lakes
 Goose Lake

Landmarks
 Black Partridge Forest
 Red Gate Woods (Cook County Forest Preserves)
 Sag Quarries Forest Preserve
 Tampier Slough Woods (Cook County Forest Preserves)

Demographics

Political districts
 Illinois's 13th congressional district
 State House District 82
 State Senate District 41

References
 
 United States Census Bureau 2007 TIGER/Line Shapefiles
 United States National Atlas

External links
 Lemont Township official website
 City-Data.com
 Illinois State Archives
 Township Officials of Illinois
 Cook County Official Site

Townships in Cook County, Illinois
Townships in Illinois